Leonel Strumia (born 29 September 1992) is an Argentine footballer who plays as a midfielder for Aktobe.

Career

Before the 2015 season, Strumia signed for Latvian side Liepāja, helping them win the league and the 2017 Latvian Football Cup, their first major trophies. Before the 2020 season, he signed for RFS in Latvia, helping them win their first league title and the 2021 Latvian Football Cup. 

Before the 2023 season, he signed for Kazakhstani club Aktobe. On 4 March 2023, Strumia debuted for Aktobe during a 1–0 win over Zhetysu.

References

External links

 

1992 births
Alumni de Villa María players‎
Argentine expatriate footballers
Argentine expatriate sportspeople in Kazakhstan
Argentine expatriate sportspeople in Latvia
Argentine footballers
Association football midfielders
Expatriate footballers in Kazakhstan
Expatriate footballers in Latvia
FC Aktobe players
FK Liepāja players
FK RFS players
Kazakhstan Premier League players
Latvian Higher League players
Living people